The Cameroon Olympic and Sports Committee (abbreviated as CNOSC) is a non-profit organization serving as the National Olympic Committee of Cameroon and a part of the International Olympic Committee. It is also the body responsible for Cameroon's representation at the Commonwealth Games.

History 
The Cameroon Olympic and Sports Committee was created on the 17 October 1963, during the International Olympic Committee meeting held in Baden in the Federal Republic of Germany.

List of presidents 
The following is a list of presidents of the CNOSC:

Member federations 

The Cameroonian National Federations are the organizations that coordinate all aspects of their individual sports. They are responsible for training, competition and development of their sports. There are currently 20 Olympic Summer and eight Non-Olympic Sports Federations in Cameroon.

Olympic Sport federations

Non-Olympic Sport federations

See also 
Cameroon at the Olympics
Cameroon at the Commonwealth Games

References

External links 
Official website
IOC website

Cameroon
Cameroon
 
Olympic
1963 establishments in Cameroon